Gamka is a South African place name and may refer to:

Dams on the Gamka River
 Leeu-Gamka Dam, on the Leeuw River near Beaufort West, Western Cape, South Africa
 Gamkapoort Dam, on the Gamka River, near Prince Albert, Western Cape, South Africa
 Gamka Dam, on the Gamka River in South Africa

Other uses
 Leeu-Gamka, a town in the Great Karoo
 Gamkaberg, a mountain in the Little Karoo and its associated nature reserve
 Gamkapoort Nature Reserve, part of the Cape Floral Region Protected Areas
 Gamka River, a South African river